John Pennycuick may refer to:
 Brigadier John Pennycuick (brigadier) (1789–1849), British Army officer who died at the Battle of Chillianwalla in the Second Anglo-Sikh War
 Colonel John Pennycuick (British engineer) (1841–1911), British Army engineer and civil servant, son of the brigadier
 Sir John Pennycuick (judge) (1899–1982), English barrister and judge, son of the colonel
John Pennycuick (tennis), see 1931 Wimbledon Championships – Men's Singles